The 2018 IMSA Prototype Challenge presented by Mazda is the thirteenth season of the IMSA Lites series and its successors and the second season as the IMSA Prototype Challenge. The season features 6 races across 6 weekends.

Series news
2018 is the final season Fox Sports will televise the series, NBC Sports Group becomes the series' broadcaster, starting in 2019.
2018 is also the final season that Continental Tire will be the tire supplier, Michelin will take over that role for the 2019 season.
2018 will be the final season of the Mazda Prototype Challenge (MPC) class, with LMP3 to become to sole class from 2019 onwards.

Classes
Le Mans Prototype 3 (LMP3)
Mazda Prototype Challenge (MPC)

Calendar

Race schedule
The 2018 schedule was released on 24 August 2017 and features six rounds.

1 LMP3 will participate in this race with the WeatherTech SportsCar Championship's GT Daytona class and the Grand Sport and TCR cars from the Continental Tire SportsCar Challenge as one single four-hour race. This race will preview the 2019 IMSA rules package and new tyre supplier Michelin.

Calendar Changes
The race weekend format has been changed to feature a single 1 hour 45-minute race instead of two 45 minute races as was the case in 2017.
The rounds at Watkins Glen International, Lime Rock Park and Circuit Trois-Rivières were removed from the calendar and replaced by rounds at Daytona International Speedway and Virginia International Raceway, this reduced the number of events from seven down to six.

Entry List

LMP3
All teams use Nissan VK50VE 5.0L V8 engines.

Note: A driver with a (M) is participating in the Amateur Masters Category.

Mazda Prototype Challenge (MPC)
All teams use Elan DP02 chassis and Mazda MZR 2.0L 4 cylinder engines.

Results

Race Results

Bold indicates overall winner.

Points system

Drivers' Championships

LMP3

Mazda Prototype Challenge

Team's Championships

LMP3

Mazda Prototype Challenge

References

External links 
 Prototype Challenge Website
 IMSA Website

2018
2018 in American motorsport